Soundarya Sharma (born 20 September 1994) is an Indian actress and model who works in Hindi films. She made her acting debut with romantic Ranchi Diaries in 2017 for which she won the 'Best Debutante' at the Jharkhand International Film Festival and was nominated at Zee Cine Awards. She is known for participating in Colors TV's reality show Bigg Boss 16.

Early life

She was born and raised in a family from New Delhi.

Career 
Sharma played the lead role in the film Ranchi Diaries, which was produced by Anupam Kher. The film was released in October 2017, and she was nominated for the 'Best Female Debutant' by Zee Cine Awards and Star Screen Awards. She won the 'Best Debutante' at the Jharkhand International Film Festival.

She won the Lokmat Most Stylish Diva Award at Lokmat Stylish Awards in 2018. Soundarya was also a part of a Times Music exclusive release titled Garmi Mein Chill.

In 2022, she was seen in MX Player's crime web series Raktanchal 2 playing Roli. She also took some workshops at Lee Strasberg Theatre and Film Institute and the New York Film Academy.

In 2022, she was seen in Colors TV's reality show Bigg Boss 16. On Day 112, she was evicted, where she finished at 9th place.

Filmography

Films

Television

Web series

Accolades

See also 
 List of Indian film actresses

References

External links 

 
 
Living people 
1994 births 
Actresses in Hindi cinema